Moondwara is a village in tehsil sikar of Sikar district in Rajasthan, India.
It is situated at a distance of 18 kilometres from Sikar in the south-west direction on Sikar-Naguor-Jodhpur road. This is an old historical village founded 600 years ago. This is a well-connected village.
There are 500 families living in the village. It is a well-designed village. There is one road-crossed the village. There is one bazar in the center of the village.

External links
 Details of Sarpanch in Sikar
 List of all villages of Rajasthan with their Panchayat Samiti

References

Villages in Sikar district